The International Journal of Psychoanalysis is an academic journal in the field of psychoanalysis. The idea of the journal was proposed by Ernest Jones in a letter to Sigmund Freud dated 7 December 1918. The journal itself was established in 1920, with Jones serving as editor until 1939, the year of Freud's death.

The International Journal of Psychoanalysis incorporates the International Review of Psycho-Analysis, founded in 1974 by Joseph Sandler. It is run by the Institute of Psychoanalysis. For the last 95 years, the IJP has enjoyed its role as the main international vehicle for communication about psychoanalysis, enjoying a wide international readership from Europe, the Middle East, Africa, Asia-Pacific, North America, and Latin America. Past Editors of the International Journal have included Ernest Jones, James Strachey, Joseph Sandler, David Tuckett, and Dana Birksted-Breen. In 2015 the IJP had around 9000 subscribers.

Francis Grier is the current Editor in Chief of The International Journal of Psychoanalysis. There are six Associate Editors from four different geographic regions: Lesley Steyn (UK), Bernard Reith (Europe), Bruce Reis (North America), Beatriz de León de Bernardi (Latin America), Georg Bruns and Sara Boffito; an Executive Editor, Catherine Humble (London); and Editors of specific sections, such as Education, The Analyst at Work, Psychoanalytic Controversies, Book Reviews, Psychoanalysis in the Community and Film Essays.

In 2013 the journal established the online open peer review, multi-language site IJP-Open (IJP Open on Pep-Web). In 2023 IJP Open was expanded to also include information about the recommendations papers receive, as well as replies from authors and revised versions of papers. With the IJP Annuals (www.annualsofpsychoanalysis.com), each year papers from the journal are selected and translated into eight different languages: French, Spanish, German, Italian, Portuguese, Russian, Greek, and Turkish.

See also
 International Psychoanalytical Association
 List of psychotherapy journals
 Internationale Zeitschrift für Psychoanalyse, a German-language journal established in 1913.

References

External links
 

Psychotherapy journals
Bimonthly journals
English-language journals
Publications established in 1920